Jim Nevin  (26 January 1931 – 10 August 2017) was an Australian cyclist. He competed at the 1952 and 1956 Summer Olympics. In 1953, he won stage 4 of the Tour of Ireland.

Nevin was awarded the Medal of the Order of Australia in the 1994 Australia Day Honours. He received the Australian Sports Medal in 2000.

References

External links
 

1931 births
2017 deaths
Australian male cyclists
Olympic cyclists of Australia
Cyclists at the 1952 Summer Olympics
Cyclists at the 1956 Summer Olympics
Cyclists from Melbourne
Australian track cyclists
Recipients of the Medal of the Order of Australia
Recipients of the Australian Sports Medal